Anna Maria Janssens (circa 1605 – 1668) was a Flemish painter.

She was trained by her father Abraham Janssens and on 5 July 1626 married the painter Jan Brueghel the Younger with whom she had eleven children. She was known for floral paintings in the Brueghel family style, and a signed but undated floral painting was published by Marie-Louise Hairs in 1985. Janssens was registered as member of the Antwerp guild of Saint Luke between 1645-1668.

References 

 Marie-Louise Hairs, Les peintres Flamands de fleurs au XVIIe siècle, 1985, pages 236-7

1605 births
1668 deaths
Painters from Antwerp
Women painters